FC Blue Boys Muhlenbach, commonly known as Blue Boys Muhlenbach, was an association football club based in the Muhlenbach district of Luxembourg, the capital city of Luxembourg.

History
The club was founded in 1932 as FC Blue Boys Muhlenbach, but changed its name to Sport Verein Muhlenbach. The original name was restored in 1944 and remained until 2009, when the name of Muhlenbach Lusitanos was adopted. In 2012 the club was renamed again as FC Blue Boys Muhlenbach. As of the 2011–12 season, they played in the Luxembourg Division of Honour, the second tier of football in the country.

Blue Boys were promoted to the top flight of Luxembourg football in 2019.

On 18 May 2020 the club merged with FC RM Hamm Benfica.

Current squad

References

Club profile at the Luxembourg Football Federation
Club history by weltfootballarchiv.com

Defunct football clubs in Luxembourg
Association football clubs established in 1932
1932 establishments in Luxembourg
Association football clubs disestablished in 2020
2020 disestablishments in Luxembourg